Bakia is a populated settlement in the Boffa Prefecture, Boké Region, Guinea.

History
Emmanuel Gomez, senior, a Portuguese slave trader gained control of Bakia in the eighteenth century. His son, Emmanuel Gomez, junior succeeded him and his daughter Niara Bely married and became ruler of nearby Farenya.

References

Populated places in the Boké Region